is a Japanese footballer who plays as a defender for Iwaki FC on loan from Albirex Niigata.

Club career 

Endo made his professional debut in a 4–1 Emperor's Cup match against Zweigen Kanazawa.

Endo was loaned out to Iwaki FC on 17 June 2022. On 5 November at same year, he was brought his club promotion to J2 League for the first time as well J3 League champions in 2022 season. On 6 December at same year, Endo extended contract on loan at club for 2023 season.

Career statistics

Club 

.

Honours 
Iwaki FC
 J3 League: 2022

References

External links

1998 births
Living people
Association football people from Saitama Prefecture
Toin University of Yokohama alumni
Japanese footballers
Association football defenders
J2 League players
J3 League players
Urawa Red Diamonds players
Toin University of Yokohama FC players
Albirex Niigata players
Iwaki FC players